The 1991 National Soccer League season was the sixty-eighth season under the National Soccer League (NSL) name. The season concluded on September 22, 1991, with Toronto Italia securing the NSL Championship by finishing first in the standings by a single-point difference between Scarborough International and St. Catharines Roma. 

The NSL Ontario Cup was claimed by Toronto Argentina after defeating the Toronto Jets at Lamport Stadium in Toronto, Ontario. The Toronto side would also add the NSL Canadian Cup to their résumé by defeating the Montreal Dollard at Complexe sportif Claude-Robillard in Montreal, Quebec.

Overview  
The membership in the league increased to a total of ten clubs from the nine of the previous season. Two of the new additions were revealed at the annual general meeting held in Toronto on December 2, 1990. NSL Second Division titleholders North York Strikers were promoted to the First Division, while Toronto International later relocated to Scarborough, Ontario returned to the league after a stint in the Ontario Soccer League. The Toronto Jets and Woodbridge Azzuri were also promoted to the First Division. While Toronto Argentina was the lone expansion franchise that made its NSL debut in 1991.       

The increase in membership was rather poignant as the league lost two established clubs Toronto First Portuguese and Toronto Panhellenic due to a depletion of financial resources. America United and Oshawa Italia were the other two clubs that were disbanded. After establishing the necessary connections in the Quebec soccer structure league commissioner Rocco Lofranco announced potential expansion plans into the province. The member clubs also began the transition of recruiting more domestic players instead of relying on imports. After a series of philosophical differences and disputes with the Canadian Soccer Association (CSA) about the structure of professional soccer officials from the NSL began negotiations with the CSA, which resulted in a friendly match between the Canadian Olympic team and Toronto Italia. 

The league continued operating the NSL Canadian Cup where the NSL Ontario Cup champions faced the league cup winner from the Quebec National Soccer League.

Teams

Final standings

Individual awards  
The recipients for the annual NSL awards were announced on December 18, 1991, with members from London City, Toronto Croatia, and Toronto Italia receiving the awards. After successfully leading Italia to a championship title Peter Felicetti was named the Coach of the Year. Felicetti previously had managerial experience in the Canadian Soccer League, and later managed in the American Professional Soccer League with Toronto Rockets. London City's Paul Hillman was recognized as the Rookie of the Year. Ivica Raguž of Toronto Croatia was given the MVP award, and would ultimately play in the Croatian First Football League, and the S. League.

References

External links
RSSSF CNSL page
thecnsl.com - 1991 season

 
1991–92 domestic association football leagues
National Soccer League
1991